Luiz Alberto Figueiredo Machado (born 17 July 1955) is a diplomat who is currently serving as the Brazilian Ambassador for Climate Change since February 2023.  He was the former Minister of External Relations, having succeeded Antonio Patriota and was succeeded by Mauro Vieira. Figueiredo took office as foreign minister on August 28, 2013., and left office on December 31, 2014.

Biography

Early life
Luiz Figueiredo was born on July 17, 1955, in Rio de Janeiro holds a degree in law of the Federal University of Rio de Janeiro (UFRJ) in 1977 and graduated at the Rio Branco Institute (IRBr) in 1980.

Career
First assigned to New York in 1986 until 1989, he continued his professional career at Brazil's diplomatic missions in Santiago, Chile, serving until 1992. He has also held diplomatic positions in Washington, D.C. from 1996 to 1999, Ottawa from 1999 to 2002 and Paris, as representative to the United Nations Educational, Scientific and Cultural Organization (UNESCO), from 2003 to 2005.

He served as Director-General in the Ministry's Department of Environment and Special Affairs, and previously headed its Environmental Policy and Sustainable Development Divisions, as well as its Division on Sea, Antarctic and Outer Space Affairs. He came Under-Secretary for Environment, Energy, Science and Technology in Brazil's Foreign Ministry since 2011. From June to August 2013 he was the Permanent Representative of Brazil to the United Nations.

In February 2022, he was appointed to serve as the Brazilian Ambassador for Climate Change.

References

External links
 Financial Times Global Conferences & Events, 24 April 2012

1955 births
Living people
People from Rio de Janeiro (city)
Federal University of Rio de Janeiro alumni
Brazilian diplomats
Foreign ministers of Brazil
Ambassadors of Brazil to the United States
Permanent Representatives of Brazil to the United Nations